Richard Cordery is a character actor of film, television, and stage.

Career

Film and television
Cordery's television credits include Rumpole of the Bailey, as a prosecution Barrister (Series 5 Episode 6 - 1988), Doc Martin as Dennis Dodds, Whitechapel as George Collier, Garrow's Law as Sir Sampson Wright. He appeared in Midsomer Murders “The Straw Woman” as Dr John Cole in 2004, as Morris Bingham in “The-Made-to Measure Murders” in 2010, and as Atticus Bradley in “The Killings of Copenhagen“ (2014, S16:E5). He played the Duc De Raguse in the 2012 film Les Misérables.

In the 2013 film About Time, Cordery played Uncle Desmond, the "sweet but mentally-challenged" uncle of the protagonist Tim. 

In the fifth season of The Crown, Cordery portrayed Marmaduke Hussey, the Chairman of the Board of Governors of the BBC from 1986 to 1996.

Theatre
Much of Cordery's acting career has been in theatre. His body of work includes many Shakespeare performances, such as the tragedy Romeo and Juliet (1997), the trilogy Henry VI (2000), the drama Richard III (2001), the tragedy Macbeth (2004), and the comedy The Winter's Tale. In 2002, Cordery played Menenius in a Swan Theatre adaptation of the Shakespeare play Coriolanus. Later that year, he appeared as Falstaff in another Shakespeare play, The Merry Wives of Windsor. Cordery portrayed the steward Malvolio in a 2005 production of Twelfth Night at the Royal Shakespeare Theatre.

In 2008, he played Russell Blackborough in the play Waste at the Almeida Theater and the following year he appeared in the musical Spring Awakening at the Lyric Theatre. Cordery appeared as Canon Chasuble in a 2011 production of The Importance of Being Earnest at the Rose Theatre, Kingston. The Daily Telegraph praised the actor for giving a "performance of comic bliss as the amorous and sententious Canon Chasuble, baffled by each new turn of events while supporting his prodigious bulk on a surprisingly nifty pair of pins."

Personal life
Cordery is a former teacher who once taught in an inner-London secondary school.

Filmography

References

External links

Living people
British male television actors
21st-century British male actors
20th-century British male actors
British male film actors
Year of birth missing (living people)